Pizzo di Röd is a mountain of the Lepontine Alps, overlooking Fusio in the canton of Ticino. It is located on the chain separating the Valle di Peccia from the Val Lavizzara.

References

External links
 Pizzo di Röd on Hikr

Lepontine Alps
Mountains of the Alps
Mountains of Switzerland
Mountains of Ticino